The early impact of Mesoamerican goods on Iberian society had a unique effect on European societies, particularly in Spain and Portugal. The introduction of American "miracle foods" was instrumental in pulling the Iberian population out of the famine and hunger that was common in the 16th century. Maize (corn), potatoes, turkey, squash, beans, and tomatoes were all incorporated into existing Spanish and Portuguese cuisine styles. Equally important was the impact of coffee and sugar cane growing in the New World (despite having already existed in the Old World). Along with the impact from food, the introduction of new goods (such as tobacco) also altered how Iberian society worked. One can categorize the impacts of these New World goods and foods based on their influence over the state, the economy, religious institutions, and the culture of the time. The power and influence of the state grew as external entities (i.e. other European nations) became dependent on Spain for these New Goods in the early 16th century. The economies of both Portugal and Spain saw an enormous increase in power as a result of trading these American goods.

Luxury goods and foods

Several of the goods and foods brought to the Old World appealed to the lavish tastes of the upper classes. The difficulties involved in gaining this goods led them to go for higher prices and their elite status amongst the rich.

Cocoa

Chocolate was by far one of the most influential of the New World goods on Spanish, and later European, society. By the 1590s, chocolate had a significant presence in the Iberian Peninsula. The growing chocolate habit in Spain led to a cross-cultural transmission of tastes (such as vanilla, pepper, the color red, and a foamy froth similar to that found in chocolate). The taste for chocolate diffused in a bottom-up fashion as colonists and conquistadors encountered new native tastes. Spaniards in the Americas who initially encountered the chocolate liquid had mixed reactions, but a love for the new taste quickly spread into the Iberian Peninsula itself. The method in which chocolate's popularity spread changed by the time it had reached the peninsula. Cacao was necessary for chocolate, but it also served as a currency throughout Mesoamerica, which is evidence of its status as a precious good throughout the region. If a commoner were to drink it, it would be seen almost as bad as saying a bad prayer or omen. Chocolate began to form a relationship with the people it would be found at weddings or betrothals. The upper class in Spain would embrace this chocolate craving to the point where the lower classes sought to emulate them. For natives, chocolate was filled with religious meaning while it played the role of a drug for the Spanish. The distinction between how the two societies perceived the role of chocolate's use is interesting. Natives saw this liquid through the lens of religious meaning while the Spanish saw the economic and culinary benefits. By the 1620s, thousands of pounds of chocolate were imported to Spain annually. The components of European chocolate evolved over time as the Spanish sought to modify the formula to reflect available resources (such as adding sugar as a sweetener rather than honey). Chocolate started a lavish item in the diets of the Spanish nobility but eventually became an accessible commodity for all members of Spanish society. While the initial interest in chocolate for the Spanish was hampered by negative stigmas (i.e. that chocolate drinking was a form of idolatry), chocolate went on to become one of the most desired and influential goods from the New World.

Sugar

While initially a crop of the Indian subcontinent, the cultivation of sugar in the New World had significant effects on Spanish society. New World sugar cultivation added to the growing power of the Spanish and Portuguese economies while also increasing the popularity of slave labor (which had severe impacts on African, American, and European societies). Sugar started off as a mark of social statues amongst the upper classes but gradually trickled down towards the lower classes. This desire for sugar reflected social reasons other than simply a biologically pleasing taste for the tongue. 
Sociologist Pierre Bourdieu argues that subjective pleasures, such as a taste for sugar, reflect social constructs and often are determined by those in power. Bourdeieu's argument certainly suggests that the popularity of sugar in Iberian society was a result of the perceived value placed on it by the upper classes whom held power.

Coffee

While initially an Ethiopian product, the cultivation of coffee in the New World increased its popularity amongst the European population substantially. The cultivation and spread of coffee into Europe was started in the 15th century in the Arab world. The assimilation of chocolate into Spanish tastes paved the way for coffee as the new hot stimulant drink to gain popularity in Spain. Coffee imports even surpassed those of chocolate by the 18th century. The desire for coffee, like that of chocolate, eventually spread to include all castes in Iberia. Coffee, along with chocolate and sugar, stimulated a growing taste for New World sweet goods.

Tobacco

As known more now than ever, tobacco had very addictive qualities. The insidious addictiveness of tobacco led to an increasingly prominent demand for the good in New World trade. The plant was initially smoked by native tribes in the Americas for ceremonial purposes. It was believed to be a gift from the gods and was used primarily by religious leaders. The Spanish changed this dynamic of the crop when they began trading tobacco as a commodity. The demand for tobacco stimulated the Spanish and Portuguese trade networks as well as increased Iberian power in world trade. The tobacco trade dominated the economies of the south-eastern US up until the peak of cotton's popularity in world trade.

Vanilla

Vanilla, a flavoring derived from the orchids of the genus Vanilla, was first brought to Spain in the 1520s by Cortez following his conquest of the Aztec Empire. The Aztecs had started cultivating the plant following their subjugation of the Totonec peoples of present-day Mexico.

Vanilla quickly became popular as a sweetener in Spain and then the rest of Europe. Along with coffee and chocolate, sugar started a desire for sweet tastes from the New World. The crop eventually spread down to the rest of European society and has become and incredible common good in European society. One could even argue sugar had reached the status of a staple for Iberian and, in a broader sense, European society.

Staples

Several foods that came from the New World rapidly became staples in Europe. Examples of European dependence on Mesoamerican foods can be found in Ireland with the potato and in Italy with the tomato.

Maize

Columbus encountered and noted the cultivation of maize on all of his voyages. The Aztecs and Mayans of Central America had long cultivated several forms of the crop before its introduction into Europe. Traders and merchants brought corn back to Europe in the 16th century where, due to its ability to grow in diverse regions, the crop spread rapidly in popularity. Maize became a pivotal crop in the Turkish Empire and the Balkans by the mid 16th century. Maize became a necessity for the growing Ottoman armies and was noted for its productive harvests. The fact that corn had reached the Ottoman Empire by the mid-16th century certainly suggests it was a prevalent crop in both Spain and Portugal at the time.

Squash

The native populations of the Americas had long relied on squash, along with corn and beans, as prime staples for their peoples. The Spanish who brought this crop back to Europe found similar practical use in the crop and adopted it as a staple. Squash was known in the Turkish Empire by 1539. This could have possibly been the result of goods brought from expelled Spanish Jews and Muslims. If this is true, then it raises an interesting question about how the expulsion of Jews and Muslims from the Iberian Peninsula altered the rest of the Old World. Jews and Muslims leaving the peninsula would bring with them goods, customs, and traditions from Spain to their new homes. This certainly could have been the reason why squash had reached the Ottomans in the early 16th century.

Beans

While beans have long been around in Europe and Asia. Common, lima, and sieva beans are a few of the new types of beans that were introduced to Europe following Columbus's initial voyages. Natives had long recognized the protein-rich benefits of beans. The Spanish were quick to adopt the new beans into their diets.

Tomatoes

Tomatoes had long been popular in South America where the native peoples of Peru grew and traded them. Cortez's conquests in the 16th century resulted in the crops introduction into Spain and then Europe. The crop grew well in Mediterranean soils and quickly grew in popularity. The first discovered cookbook with tomato recipes was published in Naples in 1692.
Culinary historian Alan Davidson argues that the tomato and potato were initially treated with suspicion due to their similarity to the poisonous belladonna plant. This explains why Spanish society was initially slow to incorporate the tomato into their diet (relative to the initial popularity of other foods, such as chocolate and maize).

Turkey

Spaniards had encountered domesticated turkeys in Panama in 1502. These turkeys were part of a pre-existing land trade route throughout Central and South America carried out by various native peoples. The Spanish then brought the turkey back to Spain where it became a popular new type of meat eaten by the masses.

New peppers

Columbus had recorded at least two new types of peppers following his first voyage. Spain, following Columbus's initial encounter, gradually incorporate these new peppers into their diets and spread them throughout Europe. The spread of peppers in the Old World was dependent on pre-existing trade networks through Europe, Africa, Asia, and the Near East. The Portuguese and Ottomans were more influential in the diffusion of the Mesoamerican food complex across Europe than the Spanish (who introduced the crops in the first place). By 1543, the first European illustrations of peppers were published in a German herbal. Peppers from the New World began to replace the pre-existing peppers from Africa and Asia.

Potato

The tuberous crop known as the potato originated in the southern region of Peru. The potato served as the principal staple crop for the Inca Empire and was met with similar popularity in the Spanish Empire. Spanish armies and workers adopted the crop as a staple because of the relative ease associated with its production. Peasants also adopted the crop as the 16th century progressed. The potato continued to spread rapidly throughout Europe where, by the 19th century, it had replaced the turnip and rutabaga as the principal food staples.

Other influential goods

The influence of goods and foods from the Americas spread into other aspects of Iberian life aside from playing lavish and staple roles.

Cotton

Cotton was originally cultivated by the inhabitants of the Indus Valley. While Europe had contact with the crop before the discovery of the New World, its use and popularity increased dramatically following the incorporation of cotton plantations on newly quired American lands. Columbus encountered woven cotton fabrics in Nicaragua and Honduras during his fourth voyages. While cotton's spread into Europe was gradual, it came to revolutionize fabric production in the Old World. This crop, along with many others in the Americas, led to an increasing demand for slave labor. Cotton would reach the peak of its cultivation during the Industrial Revolution in Europe.

Rubber

Rubber was originally cultivated by the Olmec people of Mesoamerica. This was usually done by draining the sap from rubber trees. Rubber did not have an early noticeable impact on the Iberian people. The fact that the Pará rubber tree initially only grew in the Amazon Rainforest. It would not be until the 19th century that the tree was able to be grown in a non-Brazilian area.

Flow of knowledge

While not necessarily a good, the flow of knowledge from the New World that came with the introduction of new foods had an enormous influence on Iberian and European society. The knowledge on how to cultivate new foods was essential in the early spread of Mesoamerican goods into Iberian society. It is reasonable to assume that the influx of knowledge added new professions to Iberian society while changing the way pre-existing professions operated, especially in regards to agriculture.

Non-social consequences

The influx of new goods and foods into 16th-century Spain and Portugal had significant effects on other aspects of Iberian history besides merely the society.

Economic impact

Spain and Portugal, having been the first two European nations to begin trading New World goods, developed impressive economies as a result of their control over the trade of American goods and foods in the early 16th century. Cravings for New World stimulants such as coffee and sugar may have motivated people to work harder to obtain money to supply these new habits. Along with this, the accessory implements that were necessary for many of these new goods (such as tobaccos and coffee) led to a new professions aimed at manufacturing clay pipes, snuffboxes, porcelain chocolate pots etc.

The Spanish and Portuguese capitalized upon every opportunity to extract revenue back to their empires; utilizing forced labor. When the Pope banned the use of forced labor by the natives, Spanish and Portuguese entrepreneurs turned to the African Slavery. The demand for New World goods, such as chocolate, led to an enormous growth in the transatlantic slave trade during the 16th and 17th centuries. The slave trade had devastating effects on the societies of several African nations. The Spanish crown applied the tactic of extraction to keep cost at ultimate low, which led to political corruption in their colonies and back at home. Patch summarizes it as, “an entire commercial system based on government official came into existence.” Spain extractive method of its colonies would soon be problematic and outdated, as new global players would become involved in the Americas. The Spanish colonial system and economic dependency for raw materials would hinder Spain's commercial markets. Spain would place less emphasis on their colonies in North America due to its lack of mineral wealth and would use them to as buffers to protect ports and other colonies further south. Weber highlights the flaw when stating, “The economic malaise that affected Spain’s North American colonies reflected the weakness of the Spanish economy itself, built traditionally on the exportation of raw materials and the importation of manufactured goods.” Spanish economy back at home, spiraling with inflation, would become dependent upon foreign imports and manufactured goods. The significant amount of silver brought back to Spain and Portugal created inflation in Europe. For Spain, the period is referred to as Spanish price revolution. the Spanish inflation had raised domestic manufactures and made them uncompetitive. Spain's colonial agenda of extraction would lead to its inability to supply its colonies and subjects at home. Weber builds upon the Spanish inability to capitalize commercial markets when stating, “The cost of transportation plus profits for numerous middlemen and additional internal custom duties (alcabalas) along the way drove the price of some items to many time their Verecruz or Mexico City value by the time they reached the frontier.” The crown's inability to establish efficient trading route and placement of high tariffs would discourage merchants and traders from legitimate business practices. Spain's colonies in the Americas would soon suffer as merchants and traders would turn to other forms of trade. Weber summarizes it when stating, “For suppliers and consumers alike, such artificially high prices made smuggling so attractive that perhaps two-thirds of all commerce throughout the Spanish empire consisted of illegal trade, much of it with foreigner… it increased as English and French merchants grew more numerous and proximate.”

Religious impact

The abundance of meat in Spanish America led to the use of animal fats over olive oil in cooking. Pope Pius III, in recognition of the meat basis for their diet, granted a thirty-year exemption from fasting for the colonists. This led to a further reliance on meat in the Spanish American diet and persisted to be a common occurrence in the cuisine following the thirty-year mark. Similarly, the Catholic restriction on meat on Fridays led to new innovations in cuisine using newly discovered American foodstuffs.

State impact

Despite the mutual trade exclusion that existed between Spain and Portugal in the early 16th century, Portuguese merchants still acquired goods from the Spanish. This led to a Portuguese dominance on the pepper trade within Europe. The Portuguese trade with the New World flourished despite the Treaty of Tordesillas due to illicit trade and Spanish permission to Portuguese merchants to bring African slaves and other trade goods into the colonies. This obvious disregard towards sanctions on trade didn't signify inherent disloyalty, but was a necessity for those whose livelihoods depended on such trade. The trade underground trade between Spain and Portugal was heightened by the African slave trade and became well established as mutually beneficial crops (such as maize, grains, squash, and beans were traded between the nations). Venice, Genoa, and Florence (among other Old World nations) depended on Iberians for New world goods in the early 16th century.
If not for the incorporation of American "miracle foods", Europe may have not pulled out of its 16th-century cycles of hunger and starvation. The dependence on Spain and Portugal for New World goods perpetuated their colonization throughout the world. This, in turn, led to Spain and Portugal becoming the two leading world powers in the 16th and 17th centuries.

The enormous wealth being extracted from the Americas and poured into the Spanish society would lead to corruption at home and in the colonies. Corruption and accumulation of vast resources at the top of the food chain had some ripple effects throughout the core countries. Corruption ran high from the top of the system, beginning from the crown in Spain and spread throughout the colonies. Royals, elites, government officials, and merchants grew significantly wealthy in a short period of time. Patch points out that, “State played a leading role in capital accumulation under colonialism. “Corruption” was therefore an integral and necessary part of the state system.” Government officials played a key role in the system in which they helped mobilize and invest capital, channeled the surplus away from the producers, and then split the profits with their merchant partners.  Merchant status increased as corruption increased, playing a key role in spreading different commodities and ideas. One recorded instances of corruption occurred when the Crown needed revenue such as in times of war. The Sale of Magistracies began in the 1670s, when the government of the last Habsburg king, Charles II, introduced the measure in a desperate attempt to tap all possible sources of revenue. Technically not sold but a post was usually granted to worthy subject who had performed monetary service for the king. Corruption ran high as the sale of a post became more commonly sold then given away.

Cultural impact

By the late 1630s, it was increasingly common to find depictions of chocolate accouterments in still life paintings.

References 

16th century in Spain
16th century in Portugal
Historical foods
History of Mesoamerica